Indian Strategic Petroleum Reserves Limited (ISPRL) is an Indian company responsible for maintaining the country's strategic petroleum reserves. ISPRL is a wholly owned subsidiary of the Oil Industry Development Board (OIDB), which functions under the administrative control of the Ministry of Petroleum and Natural Gas. 

Strategic crude oil storages are at three underground locations in Mangalore, Visakhapatnam and Padur (Udupi, Karnataka). All these are located on the east and west coasts of India which are readily accessible to the refineries. These strategic storages are in addition to the existing storages of crude oil and petroleum products with the oil companies and serve in response to external supply disruptions.

Indian refiners maintain 64.5 days of crude storage, so India has overall reserve oil storage of 74 days.

History
The Gulf War in 1990 caused a sharp rise in oil prices and a massive increase to India's imports. During the subsequent 1991 Indian economic crisis, foreign exchange reserves could barely finance three weeks' worth of imports while the government came close to defaulting on its financial obligations. India was able to resolve the crisis through policies that liberalised the economy. However, India continued to be impacted by the volatility of oil prices. In 1998, the Atal Bihari Vajpayee administration proposed building petroleum reserves as a long-term solution to managing the oil market. Three storage facilities were built in underground locations in Mangalore, Visakhapatnam and Padur. A total of 5.33 MMT (million metric tons) storage capacity was built at an investment of $600 million in the first phase.

In the 2017-18 budget speech by the Indian finance minister Arun Jaitley, it was announced that two more such caverns will be set up Chandikhole, Odisha and Bikaner in Rajasthan as part of the second phase.  In June 2018, the Narendra Modi administration approved the construction of a new storage facility in Chandikhole and doubling the capacity at Padur. This would raise India's strategic reserve capacity to 11.83 million tonnes.

Apart from this, India is planning to expand more strategic crude oil facilities in second phase at Rajkot in Gujarat.

Storage capacity

See also

Global strategic petroleum reserves

External links
 ISPRL website
 Explained: Why India Plans to Outsource Its Strategic Petroleum Reserves

References

Petroleum economics
Institutions of Petroleum in India
Energy security
Oil storage
Companies based in Noida
Indian companies established in 2005
Energy infrastructure in India
Ministry of Petroleum and Natural Gas
Petroleum infrastructure in India